Magee Secondary School is a public secondary school on West 49th Avenue, Vancouver, British Columbia, Canada. It is one of the first public high schools located in the Kerrisdale neighbourhood and is fed by the surrounding elementary schools in its catchment area. They include Maple Grove Elementary School, Dr. R. E. McKechnie Elementary School, and David Lloyd George Elementary School. It was used as a temporary hospital during the Influenza Epidemic in 1918.

History

The school was named after one of the first European settlers of British Columbia, with the school being located in the upstairs of Eburne Superior School at the current location of David Lloyd George; it was relocated in 1913 to its current location. While the original Magee Secondary School was built in 1914, it has since been reconstructed. The new Magee officially opened in the year 2000, right in time for the new millennium.

The current student population at Magee is approximately 1275, and it has approximately 100 staff members.

Magee boasts an outstanding fine arts department. More than 500 students are involved in the award-winning music department's three faculties: band (4 concert bands and 2 jazz bands), concert choir, Evolution choir, chamber choir, strings, and a recent addition of the Magee Symphony Orchestra. Magee senior music students tour internationally every two years. Recent tours have included Hawaii, Thailand, St. Petersburg, Russia (2007), Japan (2009), Central Europe (2011), Spain (2013), the UK (2015), Cuba (2017), and the Baltic States of Finland, Estonia, and Latvia (2019). Some members of the String Orchestra were invited to play on the recording of International Recording Artist K’Naan's new rendition of "Wavin’ Flag" for the Young Artists for Haiti project produced by legendary rock producer, Bob Ezrin.  Many of the graduates of the art department go on to careers in art, with many of them studying internationally.

Program 
Magee Secondary School offers a wide range of educational learning opportunities for students. Following the BC high school curriculum, Magee offers compulsory courses, including Math, English, Social Studies, and Science. Choice of languages includes English, Japanese, French, and Spanish.

Additionally, Magee Secondary School offers a unique educational program called SPARTS which is catered to students competing in high performance athletics or performing in the Arts at a high level of excellence  In this program, students attend school for only a portion of the day in order to accommodate for their rigorous training schedules and competitions. Students in the SPARTS program must have a training schedule that exceeds 25 hours per week from Monday to Friday. Furthermore, they are required to maintain a minimum "B" average with no failing grades or unsatisfactory behaviour or work habits  This program is offered students from Grades 8 to 12.

Library 
The Magee Secondary School Library is located on the second floor, and run by school librarians, supervising teachers and groups of volunteering students. A computer lab is inside the library where people can read online and take courses.

Sport Program 
Magee teams play in the Vancouver Secondary School Athletic Association and Vancouver Sea to Sky Athletic Association, which is part of BC School Sports umbrella. The Magee Athletics Program offers sports based on seasons and genders. In fall, aquatics badminton, cross country field, hockey, rugby, soccer, and volleyball are offered, while in Winter, rugby, soccer, softball, tennis, track and field are on offer. Volleyball occurs across both seasons.

In 2020, the Juvenile Girls (Gr. 9) basketball team won the 2019-20 VSSAA City Champion title.

Magee and Hollywood
Magee Secondary was used as fictional Buffalo, New York Glenn High School in I Love You, Beth Cooper.
Magee was also used to film part of Shattered, starring Callum Keith Rennie.

Notable alumni

Gary Basaraba (1976), actor 
Gil Bellows (1985), actor 
Frances Chung, principal dancer with the San Francisco Ballet
Robert Christy (1932), physicist
Bernie Coulson (1983), actor
Joey Haywood (2002), professional basketball player
Thomas Fung, businessman (Fairchild Group)
Bruce Greenwood (1974), actor
Margot Kidder (1965), actress
Michelle Lang (1993), only Canadian reporter to die in the War in Afghanistan
Fredrik Logevall (1981), Pulitzer Prize-winning historian
Graham Ludlow (1979), actor, screenwriter and producer 
Grant McCracken (1969), anthropologist
Rebecca Marino, tennis player
Carrie-Anne Moss (1985), actress 
Grace Park (1992), Hollywood actress
Josh Ramsay (1998), lead singer of the band Marianas Trench 
Dal Richards, OBC conductor and musician
Rachel Roberts (1996), actress, model 
Jeremy Ten (2008), figure skater, 2009 Canadian Bronze Medalist
Emmanuelle Vaugier (b. 1976), actress
Richard Zokol, former PGA golfer winner of 1992 Greater Milwaukee Open
Alexander Gumuchian, Canadian rapper, better known by his stage name, bbno$

References

External links
 
 Band Department YouTube Channel

High schools in Vancouver
Educational institutions established in 1913
1913 establishments in British Columbia